In the Year of Jubilee is the thirteenth novel by English author George Gissing. First published in 1894.

In the summer of 1893 Gissing returned to London after living for two years in Exeter, and took lodgings with his second wife at 76 Burton Road, Brixton: "he realised that in South London there was a new territory open to a novelist’s exploitation. From Burton Road he went for long walks through nearby Camberwell, soaking up impressions of the way of life he saw emerging there." This led him to writing In the Year of Jubilee, the story of "the romantic and sexual initiation of a suburban heroine, Nancy Lord." Gissing originally called his novel “Miss Lord of Camberwell”.

The title refers to the Golden Jubilee of Queen Victoria in 1887.

References

Further reading

 Coustillas, Pierre, ed. (1978). London and the Life of Literature in Late Victorian England: The Diary of George Gissing, Novelist. Hassocks: The Harvester Press.
 Glover, David (2001). "'This Spectacle of a World's Wonder': Commercial Culture and Urban Space in Gissing's In the Year of Jubilee." In: A Garland for Gissing. Amsterdam: Rodopi, pp. 137–152.
 Greenslade, William (2001). "Writing Against Himself: Gissing and the Lure of Modernity in In the Year of Jubilee." In: A Garland for Gissing. Amsterdam: Rodopi, pp. 271–278.
 Harman, Barbara Leah (1992). "Going Public: Female Emancipation in George Gissing's In the Year of Jubilee," Texas Studies in Literature and Language, Vol. XXXIV, No. 3, pp. 347–374.
 Harsh, Constance D. (1994). "Gissing's In the Year of Jubilee and the Epistemology of Resistance," SEL: Studies in English Literature 1500–1900, Vol. XXXIV, No. 4, Nineteenth Century, pp. 853–875.
 Selig, Robert L. (1969). "A Sad Heart at the Late-Victorian Culture Market: George Gissing's In the Year of Jubilee," SEL: Studies in English Literature 1500–1900, Vol. IX, No. 4, Nineteenth Century, pp. 703–720.

External links
 In the Year of Jubille, Vol. II, Vol. III, at Internet Archive
 
 

1894 British novels
Novels by George Gissing
Victorian novels
Novels set in England
Novels set in the 19th century